"Catfish" is a song written by Bob Dylan and Jacques Levy. It was originally recorded for Dylan's 1976 album Desire, but was not released until 1991 on The Bootleg Series Volumes 1–3 (Rare & Unreleased) 1961–1991. "Catfish" was a tribute to future Baseball Hall of Fame pitcher Catfish Hunter.

Cover versions 
Joe Cocker covered the song and included it on his 1976 album Stingray. Kinky Friedman released a live version on his Lasso from El Paso album. Albert Castiglia covered the song on his These Are the Days (2008) album.

References

External links
Catfish lyrics

1975 songs
Songs written by Bob Dylan
Bob Dylan songs
Songs written by Jacques Levy
Joe Cocker songs
Baseball songs and chants